Damon Whitten (born April 5, 1977) is an American ice hockey coach and former player.  He is currently the men's hockey head coach of the Lake Superior State Lakers.

Playing career
Whitten played junior hockey for the Detroit Freeze of the North American Hockey League in 1995–96 before moving to the St. Michael's Buzzers in the Ontario Provincial Junior A Hockey League the following season.  Beginning in the 1997–98 season, Whitten played four years for the Michigan State Spartans, and was named alternate captain in his senior season.  After college, he turned pro, playing two seasons in the ECHL: in 2001–02 for the Greenville Grrrowl (winning the league championship Kelly Cup) and 2002–03 for the Arkansas RiverBlades.

Coaching career
Whitten returned to Michigan State in 2004–05 to serve as an assistant coach under head coach Rick Comley.  He then spent one season as an assistant at Wayne State before moving to Alaska Anchorage for two seasons.  In 2006, he returned to his alma mater where he was named Director of Hockey Operations.  Whitten returned to the bench in 2010, when he was an assistant coach at Michigan Tech.  On April 26, 2014, Whitten was named head coach at Lake Superior State.

Head coaching record

References

External links

1977 births
Living people
People from Brighton, Michigan
Sportspeople from Metro Detroit
American men's ice hockey left wingers
Ice hockey coaches from Michigan
Detroit Freeze players
St. Michael's Buzzers players
Michigan State Spartans men's ice hockey players
Greenville Grrrowl players
Arkansas RiverBlades players
Michigan State Spartans ice hockey coaches
Wayne State Warriors men's ice hockey coaches
Alaska Anchorage Seawolves men's ice hockey coaches
Michigan Tech Huskies men's ice hockey coaches
Lake Superior State Lakers men's ice hockey coaches
Ice hockey players from Michigan